The 2021–22 Superettan season is the 5th season of Superettan (SEH), the second tier basketball league in Sweden. No team was awarded champion of the previous season due to the COVID-19 pandemic. Helsingborg BBK are the only new team this season.

Teams 
The teams for the 2021–22 season

League table

Playoffs 

2021–22 in European basketball leagues
2021–22 in Swedish basketball